From 2007 until 2016 the final game of each National Rugby League round was played on Monday nights. Broadcast by Fox Sports and Triple M, kick off time was scheduled at 19:00. From 2017, Monday Night Football was cancelled with a second game played on Friday nights instead. In 2020 as a result of a game having to be delayed at short notice due to a COVID-19 incident, a Monday night game was played.

2007 NRL season

 13 August: The Cowboys-Panthers game was the first overtime/golden point game to be played on Monday Night Football, with the visiting Cowboys eventually beating the Panthers 30–26 in extra time.

2008 NRL season

 9 June: The Storm suffer their first loss on Monday Night Football, going down 18–0 to the Titans at Robina Stadium. The Storm had previously won seven straight MNF games.

2009 NRL season

 3 August : This match celebrated the 1970s hard hitting rivalry and glory days between Wests and Manly, affectionately known as the 'Fibros (have-nots) vs Silvertails (haves) rivalry'. To commemorate the game the Tigers donned their throwback black and white Western Suburbs Magpies uniforms and stormed out to an 18-0 halftime lead. However Manly thought back valiantly in the second half and tied the scores at 18 all, before a late field goal sealed the win for Wests.

2010 NRL season

 19 April: The Storm suffer their first Monday Night Football home loss (to the Manly Sea Eagles). They were 8–0 at home on MNF previously.
 21 June: The Knights - Eels game is the lowest scoring game on MNF to date (10 points).

2011 NRL season

 18 April: The Dragons became the first road team on Monday Night Football to hold a home team scoreless by beating Souths 16–0.
 25 April: The Warriors earned their first MNF win (0-3 previously) by beating the Storm on the road and consequently putting an end to the Storm's 10 match unbeaten record at home (dating back to 19 June 2010). This is also the first time a Monday Night Football game has been played on Anzac Day.
 6 June: The Tigers' gritty one point golden point win over the Knights ensured their MNF home winning streak would not be broken. This win extended their home winning streak to six consecutive wins.
 11 July: The Knights suffered their first MNF home loss (22-12) to a depleted Cowboys side. They were previously 7–0 at home on MNF all-time.
 8 August: In the Rabbitohs-Eels game Souths set an all-time scoring record by one team on MNF by scoring 56 points against Parramatta. Previously the Tigers had held this record by scoring 54 points against the Cowboys back in 2007.
 22 August: This was to be Darren Lockyer's last ever MNF appearance, as he helped guide the Brisbane Broncos to a hard-fought 26–6 win over the Newcastle Knights.

2012 NRL season

 5 March: The Roosters staged an amazing comeback when they beat the Rabbitohs 24–20, after trailing the Rabbitohs 20–12 with less than three minutes left in the game. Anthony Minichiello scored the match winning try with just 30 seconds to go. This was also the first time the Roosters had beaten the Rabbitohs on MNF. They were 0–2 against the Rabbitohs previously.
 19 March: The Cronulla Sharks upset victory over the defending premiers the Manly Sea Eagles was notable for two reasons. Cronulla finally managed to snap their 10-game losing streak (dating back to Round 19 last year). Secondly, they ended their five-game losing streak to Manly at home (dating back to 2007). Cronulla's last victory over Manly at home was a 15–12 win in 2006.
 26 March: After losing seven straight games to the Wests Tigers, the Canberra Raiders finally broke their Tiger hoodoo by beating them convincingly 30-16 and celebrating Terry Campese's 100th NRL game in style. This upset result also ended the Tigers' MNF home winning streak at seven straight games. It was also Benji Marshall's first ever loss to the Raiders. He was 10-0 all-time against the Raiders previously.
 9 April: Manly's emphatic 30–0 win over the Penrith Panthers was remarkable for several reasons. An hour before the game both Manly's star full back and five-eighth (Brett Stewart and Kieran Foran) both pulled out due to injury. The win also extended Manly's winning streak at Brookvale Oval to eleven consecutive wins (since the start of the 2011 NRL season).
 30 April: After a two-year break, Willie Mason made a successful return to the NRL, helping the Newcastle Knights to a 34–14 win over the Penrith Panthers.
 7 May: South Sydney snapped Cronulla's impressive six-game winning streak (since round 3) with an exciting 34–28 win. Greg Inglis had a break out game in his new role as fullback, scoring three tries. Matt King also celebrated his 100th NRL game.
 14 May: The Penrith Panthers celebrated the anniversary of 100 years of rugby league in the Penrith district (Penrith's first ever recorded game was against Parramatta North on 12 May 1912 under the banner of Penrith United Football Club) in style with a thrilling upset result in overtime over the Saint George Illawarra Dragons. In doing so, the Panthers also snapped their 8-game home losing streak (a club record), which dated back to Round 20 last season.
 28 May: Krisnan Inu's first game for the Canterbury Bulldogs and 100th NRL game was a resounding success as he scored two tries and helped the Bulldogs to a 30-12 result over the Roosters.
 4 June: The Parramatta Eels overcame the biggest half time deficit ever (14 points) on MNF to beat the Cronulla Sharks. Trailing 20–6 at half time, Luke Burt & Jarryd Hayne scored two tries each in the second half to give the Eels an upset 29–20 win and secure only their second win for the season. The game was also dedicated to Luke Burt's 250th milestone. People that bought a ticket for the game were able to buy a second ticket for only $2.50. The Shark's John Morris also played his 250th game.
 18 June: In the Battle of Brookvale rematch, the Manly Sea Eagles suffered their Waterloo, going down 26–22 to the Melbourne Storm. The Storm went into the game without their key offensive player Billy Slater (injured in Origin II), but their attack didn't seem to miss a beat as they raced out to an early 12–0 lead. Although Manly clawed back to lead 18–12 at half time, after half time the Storm piled on two more tries and a penalty to lead 26–18. The Sea Eagles managed to score a consolation try in the final minute, but ran out of time to start another attacking set as the final hooter blew and the Storm held on for the win.
 25 June: The Newcastle Knights staged an amazing comeback on Monday night football. Trailing the Tigers 14-0 after 30 minutes, the Knights then ran in 38 unanswered points to eventually win the game 38–20. The Knights had come into the game with poor form, losing their last 5 games and losing four straight to the Tigers. The Wests Tigers were wearing their brand new pink and black tops to celebrate Women in League Round.
 2 July: The St George Illawarra Dragons hoodoo at Canberra Stadium continued, having not won there since 2000. The Dragons were leading 18–16 with three minutes to go before the Raider's fullback Reece Robinson cut the Dragon's defence open near their red zone and scored the match winning try. The Dragons have now lost 10 straight games in Canberra.
 9 July: The Cronulla Sharks and Sydney Roosters fought out the first ever overtime draw on MNF. A collective seven attempted drop goals in extra time could not separate the sides, with the game finally ending in a 14–14 tie. The result also ended Cronulla's six game home winning streak (since Round 3).
 16 July: Dubbed "The Miracle at the SFS", the Rabbitohs stunned the Roosters by coming back from a 22–12 deficit in the final two minutes of the game to win the game 24–22 with two quick converted tries in the final two minutes.
 27 August: Trailing the Sharks 18–10 with two and a half minutes to go in the game, the Storm suddenly kicked into top gear, scoring two quick tries and winning the game 20–18 in the final few seconds.
 2 September: This game marked the end of an era for several players. Nathan Hindmarsh (330), Luke Burt (264), Dean Young (208), and Ben Hornby (272) all played their final NRL game. The game was notable for drawing the biggest crowd (45,863) for a regular season league game in Sydney since 1969 (Balmain v South Sydney). The venue for the game was moved from Parramatta Stadium to Stadium Australia earlier in the week to accommodate the expected huge crowd. The result also marked the Eels' 10th straight loss at Stadium Australia, dating back to Round 25, 2010.

2013 NRL season

 25 March: The Newcastle Knights were missing 3 of their key players ( Kurt Gidley, Timana Tahu and Willie Mason ) going into this game, but they still managed to completely dominate the Cowboys from start to finish. This game also marked Jonathan Thurston's 200th game.
 29 April: The Penrith Panthers had lost 5 straight games going into this match, their last win being back in week one.
 6 May: The Manly Sea Eagles finally broke their Kogarah curse, winning for the first time at Kogarah Oval (since 1997) against the merged St George Illawarra Dragons. Although Manly took an early dominant 18–0 lead, they had to withstand a furious second half come back from the Dragons, with the scores being locked up at 18 all until Manly scored and took the lead again in the final ten minutes. Manly were 0–5 at Kogarah Oval previously against the St George Illawarra Dragons (since 1999).
 13 May: One week to the day after Manly broke their losing streak at Kogarah Oval, the Sydney Roosters finally broke theirs against Manly at Brookvale Oval. The Roosters had lost 5 straight games there (dating back to 2006), their last win at Brookvale Oval being back in March 2004.
 27 May: Despite missing their captain Paul Gallen, and regular playmakers Michael Gordon and Luke Lewis, the Cronulla Sharks managed to down the table topping Rabbitohs 14–12 in a tight grinding affair on a wet night at Endeavour Field.
 10 June: The Raiders continued their impressive home winning streak with an 8th straight home win at Canberra Stadium (dating back to Round 22 last year).
 22 July: The Dragons pulled off the upset of the season so far with a 22–18 overtime win over the 1st place Rabbitohs. Rated as 5-1 outsiders going into the game, the Dragons were given no chance by many experts to win the game and were actually trailing the Rabbitohs by 12 points (18-6) going into the final eleven minutes of the match. However, with two quick tries in the space of five minutes the scores were locked up amazingly at 18 all and after several failed drop goal attempts from both sides, the match went into overtime. Three minutes into the overtime period Brett Morris caught the match winning pass from Nathien Fien to win the game. The game also marked Jason Nightingale's 150th game.
 29 July: In this MNF match up Wests and Manly commemorated their historic (1970s-1980s) 'Fibros vs Silvertails rivalry' (also known as the 'have-nots' vs the 'haves') by playing each other fittingly in Round 20 - 'Rivalry Round'. This time the 'haves' won it convincingly 36-18 (the 'have-nots' won the first commemorative encounter 19-18 back in March 2009), and in doing so effectively ending the Tigers chances of making a late playoff run. The game also marked the first time Manly had ever played Wests Tigers (founded in 2000) at Campbelltown Stadium. The last time Manly played Wests at Campbelltown Stadium was back in 1998, with Manly running out similarly convincing winners (45-30). Other milestones to note in this game were prodigal Tiger players Robbie Farah and Liam Fulton playing their 200th and 150th games respectively, and departing Tiger's players Benji Marshall and Blake Ayshford playing their final game at Campbelltown Stadium.

2014 NRL season

2015 NRL season

30 March: After losing their first three games of the season, the Cowboys came from 16-4 down to defeat the Storm 18–17. This began a 12-match winning streak for the club that would set up their ultimately successful assault on the premiership title. 
20 April: Cronulla outlasted reigning premiers South Sydney 20–12 in atrocious conditions in front of 3,978. The weather was so atrocious Cronulla offered its members who made it that night T-shirts commemorating their attendance at the game and offered non-members complimentary 2 game memberships; to watch a game in better conditions. 
8 June: After trailing Parramatta 30–6, the Cowboys scored five tries in 11 minutes to win the game 36–6, which was their 11th in a row.
29 June: To commemorate their 80th anniversary the Bulldogs played two of their home games at their spiritual home Belmore Sports Ground. This game was their first match there since 1998 and was the only sold-out game in 10 years of Monday night football.

2016 NRL season

2020 NRL season

15 May: due to a teacher at the school where Canterbury Bulldogs player Aiden Tolman's child attended testing positive to COVID-19, a Sunday night game with the Sydney Roosters was postponed to allow all Bulldogs players to be tested.

See also
2007 NRL season results
2008 NRL season results
2009 NRL season results
2010 NRL season results
2011 NRL season results
2012 NRL season results
2013 NRL season results
2014 NRL season results
2015 NRL season results
2016 NRL season results
2020 NRL season results
Monday Night Football on Triple M

References

External links
https://web.archive.org/web/20110926221409/http://stats.rleague.com/
http://www.nrl.com

Monday night NRL results